An Introduction to the Three Volumes of Karl Marx's Capital is a 2004 book by German Marxist scholar Michael Heinrich aiming to introduce the three volumes of Karl Marx's magnum opus Capital. The book is structured as a shortened account of Marx's analysis of capitalism, and is written from the standpoint of the Neue Marx-Lektüre school of thought, criticizing both Marxist and bourgeois readings of Marx. An English edition was published in 2012 by Monthly Review Press, becoming the first of Heinrich's works to be translated into English.

Summary 

Heinrich's Introduction is organized around various themes present in Marx's work, and draws on the Grundrisse and Theories of Surplus Value in addition to its reading of Capital. Chapters 1 and 2 of the book introduce and place the book within the wider Marxist corpus. Chapters 3–5 discuss Capital Volume I, chapter 6 discusses Volume II, and chapters 7–10 discuss Volume III; chapters 11 and 12 discuss theories of the state and communism, respectively. The book also incorporates an analysis of the differences between the various revisions made by Marx to Capital, as well as a wide range of historical documents.

The book rejects what it calls "worldview Marxism", to which Heinrich ascribes "a crudely knitted materialism, a bourgeois belief in progress, and a few strongly simplified elements of Hegelian philosophy". Contrary to "worldview Marxism", the book contests the idea that Marx had built off the ideas of classical economics in an attempt to build an alternative political economy. Heinrich instead argues that Marx's project was based on a critique of the presuppositions of the field of political economy itself.

Like other Neue Marx-Lektüre adherents, Heinrich argues against traditional understandings of Marx's theory of value, where the value of a commodity is derived from its socially necessary labour time. Instead, Heinrich argues that Marx's theory of value is a monetary theory of value where an individual commodity has tangible value only through the act of exchange. This reading of Marx sidesteps the transformation problem by calling the problem a category error, where value and price are "different levels of description." Heinrich also rejects the significance of the tendency of the rate of profit to fall in Marx's theory of crisis, arguing that these interpretations were drawn by Engels off of incomplete works and that the tendency of the rate of profit to fall expresses a symptom rather than a cause in itself.

Reception 
The Introduction has been praised for its objective treatment of Marx and for its comprehensive inclusion of Volumes II and III of Marx's Capital, in contrast to many other books on Marx's critique of political economy which primarily write about Volume I. Heinrich insists in the book that a reading of Capital must include Volumes II and III to not be subject to distortion. In Germany, the book has been reprinted many times and is widely used in universities and Capital reading groups.

Author Doug Henwood has claimed the book is the best short introduction to Marx's Capital currently available.

The Marxian economist Paul Cockshott praised the Introduction for its clarity while criticizing Heinrich's interpretation of Marx, arguing that Heinrich's break from conventional interpretations of Marx would detach the scientific method from the labour theory of value. Sociologist John Holloway likewise praised the book as "impressively clear", but expressed that he did not share its interpretation of Marx. Social scientist Christian Fuchs criticized the book for suggesting that Heinrich's reading of Marx is universally accepted.

See also 
 Das Kapital
 Critique of Political Economy
 Law of value
 Valorisation
 Western Marxism

Citations

References 

 
 
 
 
 
 
 
 
 
 
 
 
 
 
 
 

2004 non-fiction books
Books critical of capitalism
Communist books
Books about capitalism
Books in political philosophy
2004 in economics
Historical materialism
Critique of political economy
Marxist books
Marxist theory